The House at 919 2nd in Las Vegas, New Mexico was built around 1885.  It was listed on the National Register of Historic Places in 1985.

It is a wood-frame house with stucco over original clapboard or other exterior surfaces. It has a hipped roof and small enclosed eaves with some modillion brackets, though some eave brackets have been removed. It has "lumberyard classic columns" and a "folk porch railing".

It is the northernmost of three historic houses (along with House at 913 2nd and House at 915 2nd) facing a triangular park which were together nominated for National Register listing, and its significance is that same as for the nearly identical house next door (Building #294).

References

National Register of Historic Places in San Miguel County, New Mexico
Houses completed in 1885